Pure Fingers is a live album by Stiff Little Fingers, recorded on St. Patrick's Day in 1993, at the Barrowland Ballroom in Glasgow, Scotland. Stiff Little Fingers are from Northern Ireland and playing Glasgow Barrowlands to mark St. Patrick's Day has become an annual event for the band. The gig set list contained a mixture of old favourites from the original incarnation of the band along with newer tracks from when the band reformed after splitting up for a few years.

Track listing
"Go for It" (Jake Burns, Henry Cluney) – 1:42
"Nobody's Hero" (Burns, Gordon Ogilvie) – 4:02
"At the Edge" (Burns) – 3:09
"No Surrender" (Burns) – 4.17
"Love of the Common People" (John Hurley, Ronnie Wilkins) – 2:57
"What If I Want More?" (Burns) – 1:39
"Fly the Flag" (Burns, Ogilvie) – 4:01
"Piccadilly Circus" (Ogilvie, Burns) – 4:54
"Wasted Life" (Burns) – 3:38
"When the Stars Fall From the Sky" (Burns, Bruce Foxton) – 4:03
"Road to Kingdom Come" (Burns) – 3:36
"Stand Up and Shout" (Burns, Taylor, Emanuel) – 3:02
"Smithers-Jones" (Bruce Foxton) – 2:37
"Barbed Wire Love" (Burns, Ogilvie) – 3:45
"(It's A) Long Way to Paradise" (Burns) – 3:26
"Gotta Gettaway" (Burns, Ogilvie) – 3:46
"Suspect Device" (Fingers, Ogilvie) – 3:30
"Walk Tall" (Don Wayne) – 2:21
"Tin Soldiers" (Fingers, Ogilvie) – 4:40
"Alternative Ulster" (Burns, Ogilvie) – 3:15

Personnel
Stiff Little Fingers
Jake Burns – vocals, guitar
Henry Cluney – guitar, backing vocals
Bruce Foxton – bass, backing vocals
Dolphin Taylor – drums, backing vocals
with:
Ricky Warwick – guest vocal, guitar

2001 live albums
Stiff Little Fingers live albums